The 1897 United States Senate election in Pennsylvania was held on January 19, 1897. Boies Penrose was elected by the Pennsylvania General Assembly to the United States Senate.

Results
Incumbent Republican J. Donald Cameron, who was elected in an 1877 special election and subsequently re-elected in 1879, 1885 and 1891, was not a candidate for re-election to another term. The Pennsylvania General Assembly, consisting of the House of Representatives and the Senate, convened on January 19, 1897, to elect a new Senator to fill the term beginning on March 4, 1897. The results of the vote of both houses combined are as follows:

|-
|-bgcolor="#EEEEEE"
| colspan="3" align="right" | Totals
| align="right" | 253
| align="right" | 100.00%
|}

See also 
 United States Senate elections, 1896 and 1897

References

External links
Pennsylvania Election Statistics: 1682-2006 from the Wilkes University Election Statistics Project

1897
Pennsylvania
United States Senate
January 1897 events